Eshilkhatoy (Eşilxata)  is a rural locality (a selo) in Vedensky District, Chechnya.

Administrative and municipal status 
Municipally, Eshilkhatoy is incorporated into Vedenskoye rural settlement. It is one of the four settlements included in it.

Geography 

Eshilkhatoy is located on the right bank of the Elistanhzi River.

The nearest settlements to Eshilkhatoy are Zelamkhin-Kotar in the north-east, Vedeno in the east, Mekhkadettan-Irze in the south-east, and Elistanzhi in the west.

History 
In 1944, after the genocide and deportation of the Chechen and Ingush people and the Chechen-Ingush ASSR was abolished, the village of Eshilkhatoy was renamed to Zebirkolo, and settled by people from the neighboring republic of Dagestan. From 1944 to 1957, it was a part of the Vedensky District of the Dagestan ASSR.

In 1958, after the Vaynakh people returned and the Chechen-Ingush ASSR was restored, the village regained its old Chechen name, Eshilkhata.

Population 
 1990 Census: 320
 2002 Census: 247
 2010 Census: 406
 2019 estimate: ?

According to the results of the 2010 Census, the majority of residents of Eshilkhatoy were ethnic Chechens.

References 

Rural localities in Vedensky District